Luiza da Silva e Sá-Davis (born March 29, 1983 in São Paulo) is one of the guitar players and drummers for the Brazilian indie-electro band Cansei de Ser Sexy.

Besides playing in the group, she studies fine art at college and is very interested in astrology. She sometimes  acts as a disc jockey at São Paulo clubs along with bandmate Ana Rezende, as the duo MeuKu (which means "MyAss" in English). Her hairstyle is known as "Joana in the 80s" in São Paulo.

She is openly gay.

References 

1983 births
Living people
Brazilian people of Portuguese descent
Brazilian drummers
Brazilian women guitarists
Women drummers
Brazilian lesbian musicians
Musicians from São Paulo
Women in electronic music
CSS (band) members
21st-century guitarists
21st-century drummers
20th-century LGBT people
21st-century Brazilian LGBT people
21st-century women guitarists